Joseph Pomeroy Widney High School, also known as Widney Career Preparatory & Transition Center, is a special-education magnet high school in Los Angeles, California. A part of the Los Angeles Unified School District, this school is named in honor of Dr. Joseph Pomeroy Widney.

Student profile
The school serves students ranging in ages 13 to 22 who have severe disabilities. Because students from surrounding communities are bussed to the Central Los Angeles school, its student body reflects widely diverse cultural, ethnic, and economic backgrounds.

Students' race/ethnicity is:	
 Asian: 21
 Hispanic: 208
 Black, non-Hispanic: 44
 White, non-Hispanic: 6
 Two or more races: 1

The Kids of Widney High
The school is possibly best known for its music group, The Kids of Widney High, a rock band whose membership rotates with the changing student body. The group has recorded three CDs and has appeared in the 2005 film The Ringer.

References

External links
Widney High website

Widney
Widney
Public high schools in California
Magnet schools in California
Jefferson Park, Los Angeles